Alex Jacke was born and raised in the Los Feliz neighborhood of  Los Angeles, CA.  The singer and songwriter realized his passion for music as a child when he fell in love with 1990s R&B and Hip Hop. Jacke's music influences also include soul, funk, gospel, rock, and pop music. Self-taught on the piano, he began composing songs by middle school. By the time he started his freshman year at Morehouse College, he knew music was his future and he focused his energy on songwriting, & performing at school events and venues around Atlanta. During his sophomore year, he appeared on the highly popular MTV series "My Super Sweet 16," as the special guest performer for DJ Spinderella and former NBA player, Kenny Anderson's daughter, Christy. His performance caught the attention of music executive and producer, Laney Stewart, who invited Jacke to work with him over the summer. Jacke jumped at the opportunity to pursue his dream, and left Morehouse College at the end of his junior year to return to Los Angeles. Like others before him, most notably Tricky Stewart and The-Dream. Laney Stewart took Alex Jacke under his wing which led Jacke to land a worldwide publishing deal with Music Gallery/Universal Music Publishing Group in 2011.  Along with Stewart and his production team The Sharpshootaz, Alex Jacke spent most of the first half of 2012 perfecting his debut EP, D.F.M. (Dorm Fuckin Music) released on July 9, 2012. On Valentine's Day 2013, Alex released a "Deluxe" version of his D.F.M. release, simply titled "D.F.M. Deluxe".

Music career 
After building a YouTube following doing singing cover songs, in May 2012, Jacke dropped his first single, "One Thing", which was eventually followed with the release of his "D.F.M." EP in July 2012 and then with the further release of "D.F.M. Deluxe" in February 2013.  During the summer of 2013, he was selected as a top 5 finalist for Macy's and iHeart Radio's Rising Star contest where he performed at L.A.'s iHeart Radio Festival.  He returned again in December 2013 to release a single called "Sex Is Amazing and then again in 2014, releasing another single, "Apart", on March 3, 2014.

Songwriting 
In late 2011, Alex went in the studio with his fellow Sharpshootaz members and Laney Stewart to work on songs for Jesse McCartney's latest album. One of the songs that Alex co-wrote, "Out Of Words", was leaked in July 2012

Discography 

 D.F.M. - EP (2012)
 D.F.M. Deluxe -  Album (2013)
 Sex Is Amazing - Single (2013)
 Apart - Single (2014)

Track listing & personnel
D.F.M.
 Produced by Laney Stewart
 Co-Produced by The Sharpshootaz
 Mixed by Mark "Exit" Goodchild
 Recorded by Derek Yopp
 Effects & Sound Design by Andrew Kim
 Sound Production & Sound Design by Sidney Miller

D.F.M. Deluxe
 Produced by Laney Stewart
 Co-Produced by The Sharpshootaz
 Mixed by Mark "Exit" Goodchild
 Recorded by Derek Yopp
 Effects & Sound Design by Andrew Kim
 Sound Production & Sound Design by Sidney Miller

TV 
In 2012, Jacke acted in ''MTV's My Super Sweet Sixteen

References

External links

1989 births
20th-century African-American male singers
American dance musicians
American male pop singers
American contemporary R&B singers
Living people
Singers from Los Angeles
21st-century American singers
21st-century American male singers
21st-century African-American male singers
People from Los Feliz, Los Angeles